Mile End is a small village in the English county of Gloucestershire. It belongs to the civil parish of Coleford, which is also its post town. The village lies at the western edge of the Forest of Dean. The village merges with the village of Broadwell to the south.

History
Mile End is situated on the road leading northeast out of Coleford. The road between Mile End and Poolgreen was known in 1317 as the Derkesty (later Dark Stile). It was an important route from Mitcheldean, and in the later 17th century traffic between Gloucester and South Wales used this route.

Five cottages were built on Crown land on the Five Acres road at Mile End in 1787. The inn originally known as the Royal Forester opened by the mid 1870s. The Primitive Methodists built a chapel, Mount Hermon, at Mile End in 1904. West Dean district council created a cemetery at Mile End for an area covering Milkwall, Berry Hill, and Lydbrook in 1967.

References

External links

Forest of Dean
Villages in Gloucestershire
Coleford, Gloucestershire